James Crump is an American film director, writer, producer, art historian and curator. His films include Black White + Gray: A Portrait of Sam Wagstaff and Robert Mapplethorpe; Troublemakers: The Story of Land Art; and Antonio Lopez 1970: Sex Fashion & Disco.

An art historian and curator, Crump is also the author, co-author and editor of books and has published in the fields of modern and contemporary art. His critical texts have appeared in ArtReview, Art in America, Artforum and Archives of American Art Journal for the Smithsonian Museum, among others.

Career

Crump earned a Master of Arts and Ph.D in history of art respectively at Indiana University (1993) and University of New Mexico (1996). He has collaborated with a host of museums and galleries, including Martin-Gropius-Bau, Berlin, Hammer Museum, Los Angeles, the Grey Art Gallery of NYU, Princeton University Art Museum and Huis Marseille, Amsterdam. He has organized exhibitions or published books with James Welling, Doug and Mike Starn, Nan Goldin, Ross Bleckner, Lynn Davis, and the estates of Berenice Abbott, Robert Mapplethorpe, Carlo Mollino, Willem de Kooning, Garry Winogrand, and Walker Evans.

Filmography

Black White + Gray: A Portrait of Sam Wagstaff and Robert Mapplethorpe
Crump directed the feature-length documentary film Black White + Gray: A Portrait of Sam Wagstaff and Robert Mapplethorpe , which premiered in North America at the 2007 Tribeca Film Festival and in Europe at Art Basel. It explores the influence curator Sam Wagstaff, photographer Robert Mapplethorpe and musician/poet Patti Smith had on art in New York City in the 1970s. It began airing on the Sundance Channel in March 2008.

Troublemakers: The Story of Land Art
Crump wrote, produced and directed Troublemakers: The Story of Land Art.<ref>[https://tmagazine.blogs.nytimes.com/2015/05/04/land-art-smithson-holt-heizer-troublemakers-movie/ Su Wu, A New Documentary Sheds Light on the 'Troublemakers' of Land Art, T Magazine, May 4, 2015]</ref>IMDb, Troublemakers: The Story of Land Art, 2015 Set in the desolate desert spaces of the American southwest, this feature documentary film unearths the history of land art during the tumultuous late 1960s and early 1970s. Troublemakers was one of twelve documentary films selected by the 53rd New York Film Festival, September 25–October 11, 2015.Gregg Kilday, Laura Poitras, Frederick Wiseman to Screen New Work at New York Film Festival, Hollywood Reporter, August 24, 2015 The film released theatrically at IFC Center, New York, January 8, 2016.

Antonio Lopez 1970: Sex Fashion & Disco
Written, produced and directed by Crump, this documentary film concerns Antonio Lopez (1943-1987), the Puerto Rican-born, Harlem- and Bronx-raised, bisexual fashion illustrator of 1970s New York and Paris, and his colorful and sometimes outrageous milieu.Vincent Boucher, "'Sex Fashion & Disco': Looking Back at Fashion Illustrator Antonio Lopez's Life and Career," Hollywood Reporter, November 17, 2017Antonio Lopez 1970: Sex Fashion & Disco, Dogwoof Global, LondonThe Man Who Seduced Jessica Lange, Jerry Hall and Karl Lagerfeld by Horacio Silva in W, March 2017 Antonio Lopez 1970: Sex Fashion & Disco premiered at the 2017 BFI London Film Festival and subsequently was awarded the 2017 DOC NYC Metropolis Grand Jury Prize and the 2018 Cinéfashion Film Award for Best Fashion Feature Film. The film released theatrically in the United States at IFC Center, New York, September 14, 2018, Laemmle Theatres Royal Theatre, Los Angeles, September 21, 2018 and over twenty other major US markets It became available on iTunes Store, Amazon Prime Video and Vudu January 2019 and subsequently began airing on the premium cable and satellite television network Starz May 2019.Denise Petski, "Starz Acquires Four New Documentaries for Premiere in the Spring," Deadline, January 10, 2019 The film qualified for consideration for the 2018 Academy Awards Oscar for Best Documentary Feature.

Spit Earth: Who Is Jordan Wolfson?Spit Earth: Who Is Jordan Wolfson? is a feature documentary which Artnet News called a "searing psychological portrait" of the controversial and divisive artist. The film was an official selection of the 2020 Festival International du Livre d'Art et du Film, Perpignan, France and the 2020 Lo schermo dell'arte Film Festival, Florence, Italy. Due to the Impact of the COVID-19 pandemic on cinema, the film was released worldwide May 1, 2020 on the leading streaming platforms.Spit Earth: Who is Jordan Wolfson? Official film website

Breuer's BohemiaBreuer's Bohemia is a documentary film that examines the Jewish-born Hungarian architect Marcel Breuer's experimental house designs in New England following the Second World War. The film features rare interviews and footage of Breuer, artist Alexander Calder, playwright and essayist Arthur Miller and others from their storied milieu. Breuer's Bohemia is accompanied by a companion book published by The Monacelli Press.Breuer's Bohemia (2021) directed by James Crump on IMDb

Film Awards

Publications
Books (as author)
(2021) Breuer's Bohemia, The Monacelli Press/Phaidon Press. .
(2013) James Welling: Monograph. Aperture. 
(2012) Doug and Mike Starn: Gravity of Light. Skira Rizzoli. .
(2010) Walker Evans: Decade by Decade. Hatje Cantz. .Jörg M. Colberg, book review, Conscientious.
(2009) Variety: Photographs by Nan Goldin. Skira Rizzoli. .Douglas Stockdale, book review, photo-eye Magazine.
(2007) Albert Watson. Phaidon Press Limited. .
(1995) F. Holland Day: Suffering the Ideal. Twin Palms Publishers. .Interview Magazine (April 1996) "A New Day for an Old Tale," Brad Goldfarb on F. Holland Day: Suffering the Ideal
(1993) George Platt Lynes: Photographs from the Kinsey Institute. Bulfinch Press/Little Brown & Co. .

Books (as co-author)
(Forthcoming 2023) August Sander Project, Museum of Modern Art.
(2014) Carlo Mollino: Polaroids, second edition. Damiani. .
(2013) It's Modern: The Eye and Visual Influence of Alexander Liberman. Rizzoli. .
(2012) Herb Ritts: L.A. Style. J. Paul Getty Museum. .
(2011) High Heels: Fashion, Femininity and Seduction. Thames & Hudson. .
(2010) Starburst: Color Photography in America 1970–1980. Hatje Cantz. .NPR, The Crusade for Color by Claire O'Neill
(2004) Meridel Rubenstein: Belonging: Los Alamos to Vietnam. St. Ann's Press. .
(1998) When We Were Three: The Travel Albums of George Platt Lynes, Monroe Wheeler and Glenway Wescott. Arena Editions. .Voice, January 19, 1999, "Photo Finish" by Vince Aletti
(1994) Harm's Way: Lust & Madness, Murder & Mahem. Twin Palms Publishers. .

Select books (as editor/publisher)
(2002) Garry Winogrand: 1964. Arena Editions. .
(2002) Berenice Abbott/Eugène Atget. Arena Editions. .
(2002) Carlo Mollino: Polaroids. Arena Editions. .
(2001) Robert Mapplethorpe: Autoportrait. Arena Editions. .
(2001) Richard Misrach: Golden Gate. Arena Editions. .
(2000) Richard Misrach: Sky Book. Arena Editions. .
(2000) Walker Evans: The Lost Work. Arena Editions. .
(1999) Bruce Weber: Chop Suey Club. Arena Editions. .
(1999) Peter Beard: Fifty Years of Portraits. Arena Editions. .
(1999) Robert Mapplethorpe: Pictures. Arena Editions. .
(1998) Ross Bleckner: Watercolor. Arena Editions. .
(1998) Lynn Davis: Monument. Arena Editions. .
(1998) Willem de Kooning: Drawing Seeing/Seeing Drawing. Arena Editions. 
(1998) Vik Muniz: Seeing is Believing. Arena Editions. .
(1997) Adam Fuss''. Arena Editions. .

References

External links
 

The Look of '70s SoHo—Captured in One Apartment by Mary Kaye Schilling in T Magazine, February 9, 2017
James Crump In Conversation With Michèle Lamy, Vogue Germany (German), June 2018
Looking for the Unexpected: A Portrait of James Crump, Filmmaker, by Miss Rosen in Jugular Italy (English), Issue 3, November 2019, pp. 69-81

American film directors
American art historians
American art curators
Year of birth missing (living people)
Living people